Theta Chamaeleontis, Latinized from θ Cha, is a single, orange-hued star located in the southern constellation of Chamaeleon. It is a dim star but visible to the naked eye with an apparent magnitude of 4.34. Parallax measurements by the Hipparcos spacecraft put the system at 155 light-years, or 47.6 parsecs away. It is moving away from the Sun with a radial velocity of +22 km/s.

It has 0.94 times the mass of the Sun, and has expanded to 11.5 times as wide. The star is radiating 60 times the Sun's luminosity from its enlarged photosphere at an effective temperature of 4,570 K.

It has a visual companion, Theta Chamaeleontis B. This is a magnitude 12.44 star at an angular separation of 21.1 arcseconds from component A along a position angle of 237°, as of 2000.

References 

K-type giants
Chamaeleon (constellation)
Chamaeleontis, Theta
Durchmusterung objects
071701
040888
3340